Codell is an unincorporated community in Rooks County, Kansas, United States.  As of the 2020 census, the population of the community and nearby areas was 49.

History
Codell was established as a Union Pacific Railroad depot in 1887. Union Pacific could not reach agreement with the town of Motor, so Union Pacific established the community of Codell three-quarters of a mile west of Motor. The Motor Post Office, originally established as Floreyville in 1875, was moved to Codell in 1888. The frame buildings in Motor were moved to Codell and Motor was soon abandoned.

Early in its history Codell had a school, multiple churches and a business district with a bank, telephone central office, lumber yard, grain elevator, several stores, a doctor and a barber.

Tornadoes
Codell is notable for its tornado history which earned it a mention in Ripley's Believe It or Not!. The community was hit by tornadoes on May 20 in three consecutive years: 1916, 1917 and 1918.

The 1916 tornado, estimated at F2 intensity, passed east of Codell in the early evening. The 1917 tornado reached F3 intensity and passed west of Codell, also in the early evening. In 1918, Codell took a direct hit from an F4 tornado just after dark. The school, M. E. church, hotel and several residences were completely destroyed. Many more buildings were badly damaged. Although the school was rebuilt and a new high school was built in 1938, the town never fully recovered from the devastation of the 1918 tornado.

Geography
Codell lies in Township 12 south of the city of Stockton (the county seat of Rooks County) and near the southeastern corner of Rooks County. The community lies along the banks of Paradise Creek and an abandoned railroad line.

Demographics

For statistical purposes, the United States Census Bureau has defined this community as a census-designated place (CDP).

Education

Codell is served by USD 270 Plainville Schools.

Codell High School was closed through school unification in 1965. The Codell High School mascot was Codell Cougars.

See also
 Tornado records

References

Further reading

External links

 Rooks County
 Pictures of Codell
 Rooks County maps: Current, Historic, KDOT

Unincorporated communities in Kansas
Unincorporated communities in Rooks County, Kansas
1887 establishments in Kansas
Populated places established in 1887